American Shoeshine is a 1975 American short documentary film directed by Sparky Greene. It covers the history of shoe shining in the United States, interviews current shoe shiner, and describes rag popping, a form of music made with a shoeshine rag.

Reception
In a review in Jump Cut,  Robert L. Pest states that the film fails to consider the racist history of rag popping in the presentation of rag popping as art, writing: "Had Greene chosen to confront, or at least acknowledge, the contradictions of this position, American Shoeshine would have been a different, and perhaps better, film. But as it is, American Shoeshine is still a direct and effective portrait of the history and practice of a unique occupation".

American Shoeshine was nominated for an Academy Award for Best Documentary Short.

See also
 List of American films of 1975

References

External links

1975 films
American short documentary films
1970s short documentary films
1970s English-language films
1970s American films